Quinton Donald Lucas (born August 19, 1984) is an American politician serving as the 55th mayor of Kansas City, Missouri. He was elected in 2019. He is affiliated with the Democratic party and is the city's third African-American mayor. Before his election, he was a law school professor, community leader, and city council member.

Early life and education
Lucas was born in Kansas City, Missouri, to Quincy Bennett Johnson, a single mother. He never met his father. He earned a scholarship to the Barstow School, a private school characterized by more comfortable socioeconomic circumstances than those prevailing in Kansas City's low-income East Side. Johnson said, "He saw we were struggling ... One time we lived in a hotel, and it was horrible. Quinton would go in the bathroom to study."

He was elected student body president twice and was one of the class's top students. According to Lucas, he experienced a conflict of identity due to the disparity between his social background and his ambitions. He was reluctant about leaving Kansas City upon graduation. Encouraged by his college counselor, he attended Washington University in St. Louis.

He majored in political science, and studied in South Africa. Living in Cape Town, he observed the political and cultural legacy of apartheid. This experience strongly influenced his perception of the inequalities experienced by Black people in the United States.

He attended law school at Cornell, encouraged by a professor to assist in Curtis Osborne's appeal for clemency. Though the appeal failed, Lucas found the legal experience to be transformative.

Lucas joined the University of Kansas Faculty of Law in 2012. At KU, he taught administrative law, contract law, and securities regulation.

Early political career
In 2015, Lucas ran for a city council seat in the Third District at Large. His campaign advocated for the selling of Kemper Arena instead of costly demolition, and supported public transit with future and current rail systems. He won with more than 70% of the vote. He said the city's greatest challenge was bridging the cultural and socioeconomic gaps between the eastern and western sides: "How do we get people from jobs in my part of the city, the east side of Kansas City, off into other parts of the city or even to Kansas?"

In 2016, Lucas voted for a blight designation in the southern part of the city to allow for 80 million dollars in investment. The 80 million dollars is to be used to build residential units and commercial spaces. Critics say that the city has incentivized too many developments in prosperous areas and has failed to do so in poorer community areas<ref>"Blight designation gives project a boost." Lynn Horsley. The Kansas City Star, Missouri. April 29, 2016. Accessed December 8, 2022.</ref>

His primary focus in city council became housing policy. He advocated both the development of new housing supply and the renovation of existing properties. He was decisive in shaping a 2018 ordinance that reduced the city's definition of affordable rent as up to $1,100 per month, which is 30% of the city's median income. Lucas told the Kansas City Business Journal that "$1,000 a month is still pretty high for a lot of people, but what we're trying to do is say that we will not give incentives based on affordability standards for units that are north of that figure."

During discussions surrounding the finance and development of renovating the Kansas City International Airport in August 2017, Lucas advocated for transparent municipal decision-making by calling for fewer closed Council sessions. He told The Kansas City Star'', "I think the spirit of the Sunshine Law is not for council to deliberate on myriad issues on public policy in secret."

Mayor of Kansas City
In the 2019 Kansas City mayoral election, 11 candidates ran to replace term-limited incumbent Sly James. The field later narrowed to Lucas and fellow city council member Jolie Justus. Lucas won with approximately 59% of the vote.

In late August 2020, a group of citizens criticized Lucas's COVID-19 pandemic mask regulations as harmful to small businesses and ran a failed petition to remove him from office.

In June 2021, Lucas co-founded the coalition of 11 mayors, called Mayors Organized for Reparations and Equity (MORE), dedicated to starting pilot programs for reparations for slavery in the United States.

Lucas is a member of the Kansas City Board of Police Commissioners. Two gun ordinances were passed, the first ordinance makes it illegal for anyone under the age of 18 to be in possession of a handgun or ammunition.  The Police have a higher authority to confiscate the contraband. The second ordinance makes it illegal to sell or give a gun to a minor without the consent of a parent or for military service. If ordinances are violated, the violator faces jail time, a fine, or is directed to a diversion program.

Personal life
Lucas is a lifelong fan of the Kansas City Chiefs, reportedly taking detailed notes on the performances of Kansas City sports teams.

He married his longtime girlfriend Katherine Carttar on April 9, 2021. That month, their son, Bennett, was born. They live in the historic 18th and Vine district.

See also
 List of mayors of the 50 largest cities in the United States

References

External links

Mayor Quinton Lucas official KCMO website
Quinton Lucas for KC Quinton Lucas for KC Mayor Official Campaign website

1984 births
Living people
21st-century American politicians
African-American mayors in Missouri
American expatriates in South Africa
Cornell Law School alumni
Mayors of Kansas City, Missouri
Missouri city council members
Missouri Democrats
Politicians from Kansas City, Missouri
University of Kansas faculty
Washington University in St. Louis alumni